This is a list of people on stamps of Croatia.

1941–1945

1991–present

Andrija Ljudevit Adamić, businessman (2006)
Josip Andreis, musicologist (2009)
Ivo Andrić, writer (2001)
Anthony of Padua, saint of the Roman Catholic Church (1995)
Gjuro Baglivi, physician (2007)
Mate Balota, writer (1998)
Krešimir Baranović, composer (1994)
Milan Begović, writer (1998)
Federiko Benković, painter (2003)
Stjepan Betlheim, physician (1998)
Bruno Bjelinski, composer (2009)
Ivan Brkanović, composer (2006)
Ivana Brlić-Mažuranić, writer (1996)
Hermann Bollé, architect (1995)
Spiridon Brusina, biologist (1995)
Franjo Bučar, sports popularizer and writer (1994)
Frane Bulić, archeologist (1996)
Ivan Bunić Vučić, poet (1992)
Josip Buturac, historian (2005)
Dobriša Cesarić, poet (2002)
Charles the Great, Holy Roman Emperor (2001)
Milo Cipra, composer (2006)
Clare of Assisi, saint of the Roman Catholic Church (2008)
Stjepan Cosmi, archbishop of Split (2000)
Croatia men's national handball team (2003*)
Croatia men's national water polo team (2007*)
Krešimir Ćosić, basketball player (2005)
Marya Delvard, singer and actress (2003)
Juraj Dobrila, bishop (2012)
Julije Domac, biologist (1996)
Marco Antonio de Dominis, archbishop (2010)
Domnius, saint of the Roman Catholic Church (2004)
Džore Držić, writer (2001)
Marin Držić, writer (2008)
Dubravko Dujšin, actor (1997)
Florian, patron saint of firefighters (2005)
Francis of Assisi, saint of the Roman Catholic Church (2009)
Fran Krsto Frankopan, nobleman and poet (1996)
Ljudevit Gaj, politician, linguist and writer (2009)
Grgo Gamulin, art historian and writer (2010)
Vilko Gecan, painter (1994)
Dragutin Gorjanović-Kramberger, paleontologist (1999)
Jakov Gotovac, composer (1995)
Gottschalk of Orbais, monk, theologian and poet (1996)
Juraj Habdelić, writer and lexicographer (2009)
Josip Hatze, composer and conductor (2003)
Juraj Haulik, archbishop of Zagreb (1999)
Andrija Hebrang Sr., politician (1999)
Luka Ibrišimović, Franciscan friar and rebellion leader (1998)
Goran Ivanišević, tennis player (2001*)
Dragojla Jarnević, writer (2012)
Josip Jelačić, soldier and politician (1992, 1998, 1999)
Jerome, saint of the Roman Catholic Church (2003)
Jesus, religious leader (2010)
John the Evangelist, author of the Gospel of John (2009)
John Paul II, Pope of the Roman Catholic Church (1994*, 1998*, 2003*, 2005)
Marija Jurić Zagorka, writer and journalist (2007)
Andrija Kačić Miošić, poet (2004)
Janko Polić Kamov, writer (2010)
Antun Kanižlić, theologian and poet (1999)
Ljubo Karaman, art historian (2006)
Matija Petar Katančić, writer and lexicographer (2000)
Augustin Kažotić, bishop (2002)
Vjekoslav Klaić, historian (1999)
Ivica Kostelić, alpine skier (2003*, 2011*)
Janica Kostelić, alpine skier (2001*, 2003*)
Ivan Goran Kovačić, poet and writer (1993)
Josip Kozarac, writer (2006)
Miroslav Kraljević, painter (2004)
Silvije Strahimir Kranjčević, poet (2008)
Baltazar Adam Krčelić, historian and theologian (2005)
Marko Krizin, saint of the Roman Catholic Church (1996)
Miroslav Krleža, writer (1993)
Frano Kršinić, sculptor (1997)
Izidor Kršnjavi, art historian (1995)
Franjo Kuharić, archbishop of Zagreb (2002)
Ivan Kukuljević, historian, politician and writer (1993)
Igor Kuljerić, composer and conductor (2008)
Eugen Kvaternik, politician (1996)
Matko Laginja, writer and politician (2002)
Emilij Laszowski, historian and archivist (1999)
Milan Lenuci, urbanist (1999)
Vatroslav Lisinski, composer (1994)
Ferdo Livadić, composer (1999)
Livia Drusilla, wife of Roman emperor Augustus (2005)
Blaž Lorković, economist (1992)
Hanibal Lucić, poet and playwright (2003)
Ivan Lučić, historian (2004)
Martin of Tours, saint of the Roman Catholic Church (2009)
Marko Marulić, writer (2000)
Lovro Matačić, conductor (1995)
Ivan Matetić Ronjgov, composer (2010)
Antun Gustav Matoš, writer (1998)
Andrija Maurović, illustrator and comic book author (2001)
Ivan Merz, academic (1996)
Ivan Meštrović, sculptor (2008)
Andrija Mohorovičić, seismologist and meteorologist (2007)
Vladimir Nazor, writer (1999)
Krsto Odak, composer (2008)
Vlaho Paljetak, composer (1993)
Boris Papandopulo, composer (2006)
Vesna Parun, poet (2012)
Petar Svačić, king of Croatia (1997)
Frane Petrić, philosopher and scientist (1997)
Dražen Petrović, basketball player (1994)
Gjuro Pilar, geologist (1996)
Vladimir Prelog, chemist (2001)
Ferdo Quiquerez, painter (1993)
Vanja Radauš, sculptor (2006)
Antun Radić, scholar and politician (2004)
Stjepan Radić, politician (1992, 1996, 2004)
Matija Antun Relković, writer (1998)
Rembrandt, painter (2006)
Ivan Rendić, sculptor (1999)
Nasta Rojc, painter (2006)
Lavoslav Ružička, chemist (2001)
Marija Ružička Strozzi, actress (2000)
Tadija Smičiklas, historian (1993)
Ante Starčević, politician (1992, 1996)
Stephen Držislav, king of Croatia (1997)
Aloysius Stepinac, archbishop of Zagreb (1998)
Josip Juraj Strossmayer, bishop and benefactor (1992)
Franz von Suppé, composer (1995)
Petar Šegedin, writer (2009)
Ante Šercer, physician (1996)
Antun Branko Šimić, poet (1998)
Juraj Šižgorić, poet (2009)
Antun Šoljan, writer (2003)
Josip Štolcer-Slavenski, composer (1996)
Nikola Šubić Zrinski, nobleman and soldier (1996)
Bogoslav Šulek, philologist, historian and lexicographer (1995)
Stjepan Šulek, composer (2005)
Zlatko Šulentić, painter (1993)
Dragutin Tadijanović, poet (2005*)
Nikola Tesla, electrical engineer and inventor (1993, 2006)
Ivo Tijardović, composer (1995)
Josip Eugen Tomić, writer (1993)
Tomislav, king of Croatia (1992)
Ante Topić Mimara, art collector and benefactor (1998)
Tryphon, saint of the Roman Catholic Church (2009)
Franjo Tuđman, politician (1997*, 1999)
Tin Ujević, poet (2005)
Pavao Ritter Vitezović, writer, historian, linguist and publisher (2002)
Blanka Vlašić, high jumper (2007*)
Antun Vrančić, diplomat and writer (2004)
Ivan Vučetić, anthropologist and police official (2008)
L. L. Zamenhof, creator of Esperanto (1997)
Petar Zoranić, writer (2008)
Katarina Zrinska, noblewoman and writer (1996)
Nikola Zrinski, nobleman and soldier (1996)
Petar Zrinski, nobleman and writer (1996)
Cvijeta Zuzorić, poet (1996)

Notes
* – Stamp dedicated to a living person

References

Croatia
Stamps
Philately of Croatia
Stamps